The Donetsk People's Republic football team is a team representing the Donetsk People's Republic (DPR), a disputed Russian republic in eastern Ukraine. The team is not affiliated with FIFA or UEFA and therefore cannot compete for the FIFA World Cup or the UEFA European Championship. Occasionally, the DPR team has been a member of CONIFA, although it currently is not as of November 2022.

History

The team was founded on 25 July 2015, playing Abkhazia in their first game. The DPR team took part in the 2018 CONIFA World Football Cup qualification but failed to make it through to the finals. Sascha Düerkop, general secretary of CONIFA, stated that he did not agree with the DPR team politically — comparing them negatively with the Chagossians — but that "that was not the point" and they were allowed to compete. CONIFA were criticized for supporting "Russia-backed separatism." The DPR team was scheduled to take part in the 2019 CONIFA European Football Cup but later withdrew.

Fixtures and results

See also 

 Luhansk People's Republic national football team

Notes

References

External links
  
 Official Donetsk Football Federation Official Facebook Page 

CONIFA member associations
European national and official selection-teams not affiliated to FIFA
football
Sport in Donetsk Oblast
2015 establishments in Ukraine